Double Suicide or The Suicide Pact (German: Der Doppelselbstmord) is a 1918 German silent comedy film directed by Jacob Fleck and Luise Fleck and starring Karl Ehmann, Liane Haid and Karl Baumgartner. It is based on the 1876 play of the same title by Ludwig Anzengruber.

Plot
The country boy Poldl and the country girl Agerl are in love, and want to get married, but their fathers are enemies since many years, and against their relationship. When all of them meet at the local inn, the other villagers try to reconcile the two fathers, but in vain. In a newspaper Poldl's father reads about the incessant rise of double suicides caused by broken hearts. This gives Poldl an idea. He runs away with Angerl. In the village shop they buy a piece of paper. Together they write a letter to their fathers, saying that they are going to commit suicide, because they are not allowed to get married. Then they hide in a barn at the outskirt of the village. When the two fathers read the letter, they get agonized and realize their faults. Together with some villagers they go out searching for the young couple. If Poldl and Angerl are still alive, their fathers will now consent to their marriage.

Cast
 Karl Ehmann as Leutnerbauer 
 Liane Haid as Angerl 
 Karl Baumgartner as Stauderer 
 Hans Rhoden
 Eduard Sekler as Poldl

See also
Wedding in the Hay (1951)

References

Bibliography
 Parish, Robert. Film Actors Guide. Scarecrow Press, 1977.

External links

Austro-Hungarian films
1918 films
Austrian silent feature films
Austrian comedy films
Films directed by Jacob Fleck
Films directed by Luise Fleck
Austrian black-and-white films
1918 comedy films
Austrian films based on plays
Films based on works by Ludwig Anzengruber
Films set in the Alps
Silent comedy films